Polonia Poznań is an omnisport club based in Poznań, Poland. Currently, the men's football section competes in the 5th level of Polish football. The women's football section is also one of the largest in the country.

In the past the club had many successful sections, with the rugby section a five-time Polish champion. However today rowing is the only other existing section.

External links
 Official site

Association football clubs established in 1921
1921 establishments in Poland
Football clubs in Poznań
Polish rugby union teams
Multi-sport clubs in Poland
Sports teams in Poland
Women's football clubs in Poland